MUSE (Multiple sub-Nyquist Sampling Encoding), commercially known as Hi-Vision (a contraction of HIgh-definition teleVISION) was a Japanese analog HDTV system, with design efforts going back to 1979.

It used dot-interlacing and digital video compression to deliver 1125 line, 60 field-per-second (1125i60)  signals to the home. The system was standardized as ITU-R recommendation BO.786 and specified by SMPTE 260M, using a colorimetry matrix specified by SMPTE 240M. As with other analog systems, not all lines carry visible information. On MUSE there are 1035 active interlaced lines, therefore this system is sometimes also mentioned as 1035i. It employed 2-dimensional filtering, dot-interlacing, motion-vector compensation and line-sequential color encoding with time compression to "fold" an original 20 MHz bandwidth source signal into just 8.1 MHz.

Japan began broadcasting wideband analog HDTV signals in December 1988, initially with an aspect ratio of 2:1. The Sony HDVS high-definition video system supported the MUSE system.
By the time of its commercial launch in 1991, digital HDTV was already under development in the United States. Hi-Vision was mainly broadcast by NHK through their BShi satellite TV channel.

On May 20, 1994, Panasonic released the first MUSE LaserDisc player. There were a number of players available from other brands like Pioneer and Sony, yet Hi-Vision LaserDiscs are extremely rare and expensive.

Hi-Vision continued broadcasting in analog until 2007.

History 
MUSE was developed by NHK Science & Technology Research Laboratories in the 1980s as a compression system for Hi-Vision HDTV signals.

 Japanese broadcast engineers immediately rejected conventional vestigial sideband broadcasting.
 It was decided early on that MUSE would be a satellite broadcast format as Japan economically supports satellite broadcasting.

Modulation research
 Japanese broadcast engineers had been studying the various HDTV broadcast types for some time. It was initially thought that SHF, EHF or optic fiber would have to be used to transmit HDTV due to the high bandwidth of the signal, and HLO-PAL would be used for terrestrial broadcast. Only the very lowest part of the wideband chroma component overlapped the high-frequency chroma. The narrowband chroma was completely separated from luminance. PAF, or phase alternating by field (like the first NTSC color system trial) was also experimented with, and it gave much better decoding results, but NHK abandoned all composite encoding systems. Because of the use of satellite transmission, Frequency modulation (FM) should be used with power-limitation problem. FM incurs triangular noise, so if a sub-carrierred composite signal is used with FM, demodulated chroma signal has more noise than luminance. Because of this, they looked  at other options, and decided to use  component emission for satellite. At one point, it seemed that FCFE (Frame Conversion Fineness Enhanced), I/P conversion compression system, would be chosen, but MUSE was ultimately picked.
The MUSE format which is transmitted today, uses separated component signalling. The improvement in picture quality was so great, that the original test systems were recalled.
 One more power saving tweak was made: lack of visual response to low frequency noise allows significant reduction in transponder power if the higher video frequencies are emphasised prior to modulation at the transmitter and de-emphasized at the receiver.

Technical specifications 
MUSE's "1125 lines" are an analog measurement, which includes non-video scan lines taking place while a CRT's electron beam returns to the top of the screen to begin scanning the next field. Only 1035 lines have picture information. Digital signals count only the lines (rows of pixels) that have actual detail, so NTSC's 525 lines become 486i (rounded to 480 to be MPEG compatible), PAL's 625 lines become 576i, and MUSE would be 1035i. To convert the bandwidth of Hi-Vision MUSE into "conventional" lines-of-horizontal resolution (as is used in the NTSC world), multiply 29.9 lines per MHz of bandwidth. (NTSC and PAL/SECAM are 79.9 lines per MHz) - this calculation of 29.9 lines works for all current HD systems including Blu-ray and HD-DVD. So, for MUSE, during a still picture, the lines of resolution would be: 598-lines of luminance resolution per-picture-height. The chroma resolution is: 209-lines. The horizontal luminance measurement approximately matches the vertical resolution of a 1080 interlaced image when the Kell factor and interlace factor are taken into account.

Key features of the MUSE system:
 Aspect ratio: 16:9
 Scanlines (total/active): 1,125/1,035
 Pixels per line (fully interpolated): 1122 (still image)/748 (moving)

 Reference clock periods: 1920 per active line
 Interlaced ratio: 2:1
 Aspect ratio 16:9
 Refresh rate: 59.94 or 60 frames per second
 Sampling frequency for broadcast: 16.2 MHz
 Vector motion compensation: horizontal ± 16 samples (32.4 MHz clock) / frame, a vertical line ± 3 / Field
 Audio: "DANCE" discrete 2- or 4-channel digital audio system: 48 kHz/16 bit (2 channel stereo: 2 front channels)/32 kHz/12 bit (4 channel surround: 3 front channels + 1 back channel)
 DPCM Audio compression format: DPCM quasi-instantaneous companding
 Required bandwidth: 27 MHz

Colorimetry 
The MUSE luminance signal  encodes , specified as the following mix of the original RGB color channels:

The chrominance  signal encodes  and  difference signals. By using these three signals (and ), a MUSE receiver can retrieve the original RGB color components using the following matrix:

The system used a colorimetry matrix specified by SMPTE 240M (with coefficients corresponding to the SMPTE RP 145 primaries, also known as SMPTE-C, in use at the time the standard was created). The chromaticity of the primary colors and white point are:

The luma function is specified as:

The blue color difference is amplitude-scaled, according to:

The red color difference is amplitude-scaled, according to:

Signal and Transmission 
MUSE is a 1125 line system (1035 visible), and is not pulse and sync compatible with the digital 1080 line system used by modern HDTV. Originally, it was a 1125 line, interlaced, 60 Hz, system with a 5/3 (1.66:1) aspect ratio and an optimal viewing distance of roughly 3.3H.

For terrestrial MUSE transmission a bandwidth limited FM system was devised. A satellite transmission system uses uncompressed FM.

The Japanese initially explored the idea of frequency modulation of a conventionally constructed composite signal. Approximately 3 kW of power would be required, in order to get 40 dB of signal to noise ratio for a composite FM signal in the 22 GHz band. This was incompatible with satellite broadcast techniques and bandwidth.

This reduces the effective frequency range and lowers the required power. This was feasible.

There is one more power saving that appears from the character of the human eye. The lack of visual response to low frequency noise allows significant reduction in transponder power if the higher video frequencies are emphasized prior to modulation at the transmitter and then de-emphasized at the receiver.

Sampling systems and ratios 

The subsampling in a video system is usually expressed as a three part ratio. Traditionally the value for brightness is always 4, with the rest of the values scaled accordingly.

A sampling of 4:4:4 indicates that all three components are fully sampled. A sampling of 4:2:0, for example, indicated that the two chroma components are sampled at half the horizontal sample rate of luma - the horizontal chroma resolution is halved. This reduces the bandwidth of an uncompressed video signal by one-third.

MUSE implements a similar system as a means of reducing bandwidth, but instead of static sampling, the actual ratio varies according to the amount of motion on the screen. In practice, MUSE sampling will vary from approximately 4:2:1 to 4:0.5:0.25, depending on the amount of movement. Thus the red-green chroma component  has between one-half and one-eighth the sampling resolution of the luma component , and the blue-yellow chroma  has half the resolution of red-green.

Audio subsystem 
MUSE had a discrete 2- or 4-channel digital audio system called "DANCE", which stood for Digital Audio Near-instantaneous Compression and Expansion.

It used differential audio transmission (differential pulse-code modulation) that was not psychoacoustics-based like MPEG-1 Layer II. It used a fixed transmission rate of 1350 kbp/s. Like the PAL NICAM stereo system, it used near-instantaneous companding (as opposed to Syllabic-companding like the dbx system uses) and non-linear 13-bit digital encoding at a 32 kHz sample rate.

It could also operate in a 48 kHz 16-bit mode. The DANCE system was well documented in numerous NHK technical papers and in a NHK-published book issued in the USA called Hi-Vision Technology.

The DANCE audio codec was superseded by Dolby AC-3 (a.k.a. Dolby Digital), DTS Coherent Acoustics (a.k.a. DTS Zeta 6x20 or ARTEC), MPEG-1 Layer III (a.k.a. MP3), MPEG-2 Layer I, MPEG-4 AAC and many other audio coders. The methods of this codec are described in the IEEE paper:

Real world performance issues 
MUSE had a four-field dot-interlacing cycle, meaning it took four fields to complete a single MUSE frame. Thus, only stationary images were transmitted at full resolution. However, as MUSE lowers the horizontal and vertical resolution of material that varies greatly from frame to frame, moving images were blurred. Because MUSE used motion-compensation, whole camera pans maintained full resolution, but individual moving elements could be reduced to only a quarter of the full frame resolution. Because the mix between motion and non-motion was encoded on a pixel-by-pixel basis, it wasn't as visible as most would think. Later, NHK came up with backwards compatible methods of MUSE encoding/decoding that greatly increased resolution in moving areas of the image as well as increasing the chroma resolution during motion. This so-called MUSE-III system was used for broadcasts starting in 1995 and a very few of the last Hi-Vision MUSE LaserDiscs used it ("A River Runs Through It" is one Hi-Vision LD that used it). During early demonstrations of the MUSE system, complaints were common about the decoder's large size, which led to the creation of a miniaturized decoder.

Shadows and multipath still plague this analog frequency modulated transmission mode.

Japan has since switched to a digital HDTV system based on ISDB, but the original MUSE-based BS Satellite channel 9 (NHK BS Hi-vision) was broadcast until September 30, 2007.

Cultural and geopolitical impacts 
Internal reasons inside Japan that led to the creation of Hi-Vision
 (1940s): The NTSC standard (as a 525 line monochrome system) was imposed by the US occupation forces.
 (1950s-1960s): Unlike Canada (that could have switched to PAL), Japan was stuck with the US TV transmission standard regardless of circumstances.
 (1960s-1970s): By the late 1960s many parts of the modern Japanese electronics industry had gotten their start by fixing the transmission and storage problems inherent with NTSC's design.
 (1970s-1980s): By the 1980s there was spare engineering talent available in Japan that could design a better television system.

MUSE, as the US public came to know it, was initially covered in the magazine Popular Science in the mid-1980s. The US television networks did not provide much coverage of MUSE until the late 1980s, as there were few public demonstrations of the system outside Japan.

Because Japan had its own domestic frequency allocation tables (that were more open to the deployment of MUSE) it became possible for this television system to be transmitted by Ku Band satellite technology by the end of the 1980s.

The US FCC in the late 1980s began to issue directives that would allow MUSE to be tested in the US, providing it could be fit into a 6 MHz System-M channel.

The Europeans (in the form of the European Broadcasting Union (EBU)) were impressed with MUSE, but could never adopt it because it is a 60 Hz TV system, not a 50 Hz system that is standard in Europe and the rest of the world (outside the Americas and Japan).

The EBU development and deployment of B-MAC, D-MAC and much later on HD-MAC were made possible by Hi-Vision's technical success. In many ways MAC transmission systems are better than MUSE because of the total separation of colour from brightness in the time domain within the MAC signal structure.

Like Hi-Vision, HD-MAC could not be transmitted in 8 MHz channels without substantial modification – and a severe loss of quality and frame rate. A 6 MHz version Hi-Vision was experimented with in the US, but it too had severe quality problems so the FCC never fully sanctioned its use as a domestic terrestrial television transmission standard.

The US ATSC working group that had led to the creation of NTSC in the 1950s was reactivated in the early 1990s because of Hi-Vision's success. Many aspects of the DVB standard are based on work done by the ATSC working group, however most of the impact is in support for 60 Hz (as well as 24 Hz for film transmission) and uniform sampling rates and interoperable screen sizes.

Device support for Hi-Vision

Hi-Vision LaserDiscs 
On May 20, 1994, Panasonic released the first MUSE LaserDisc player. There were a number of MUSE LaserDisc players available in Japan: Pioneer HLD-XØ, HLD-X9, HLD-1000, HLD-V500, HLD-V700; Sony HIL-1000, HIL-C1 and HIL-C2EX; the last two of which have OEM versions made by Panasonic, LX-HD10 and LX-HD20. Players also supported standard NTSC LaserDiscs. Hi-Vision LaserDiscs are extremely rare and expensive.

The HDL-5800 Video Disc Recorder recorded both high definition still images and continuous video onto an optical disc and was part of the early analog wideband Sony HDVS high-definition video system which supported the MUSE system. Capable of recording HD still images and video onto either the WHD-3AL0 or the WHD-33A0 optical disc; WHD-3Al0 for CLV mode (up to 10 minute video or 18,000 still frames per side); WHD-33A0 for CAV mode (up to 3 minute video or 5400 still frames per side).

The HDL-2000 was a full band high definition video disc player.

Video cassettes 
W-VHS allowed home recording of Hi-Vision programmes.

See also 
 Analog high-definition television system
 HD-MAC, a planned high-definition analog video standard in Europe
 Clear-Vision

The analog TV systems these systems were meant to replace:
 SECAM
 NTSC
 PAL

Related standards:
 NICAM-like audio coding is used in the HD-MAC system.
 Chroma subsampling in TV indicated as 4:2:2, 4:1:1 etc...
 ISDB

References

External links 
Example of an early MUSE LaserDisc player
Hi-Vision, MUSE, and the Optical Disc

Television technology
High-definition television
History of television
Japanese inventions
ISDB